This is a timeline documenting events of Jazz in the year 1903.

Events

 Sidney Bechet borrows his brother's clarinet, and the result is well known.

Standards

Births

 January
 18 – Min Leibrook, American tubist and bassist (died 1943).

 February
 27 – Mildred Bailey, American singer (died 1951).

 March
 8 – John Ouwerx, Belgian pianist and composer (died 1983).
 10 – Bix Beiderbecke, American cornetist, pianist, and composer (died 1931).
 20 – Einar Aaron Swan, American violinist, clarinetist, saxophonist, pianist, arranger, and composer (died 1940).
 25 – Frankie Carle, American pianist and bandleader (died 2001).

 April
 3 – James "Bubber" Miley, American trumpetist and cornetist (died 1932).

 May
 2 – Spiegle Willcox, American trombonist (died 1999).

 June
 3 – Josephine Baker, French singer, entertainer, activist, and Resistance agent (died 1975).
 12 – Emmett Hardy, American cornetist (died 1925).
 28 – Adrian Rollini, American bass saxophonist, pianist, vibraphonist, and multi-instrumentalist (died 1956).

 July
 25 – Happy Caldwell, American clarinetist and tenor saxophonist (died 1978).

 August
 14 – Jack Gardner, American pianist (died 1957).
 15
 Joe Garland, American saxophonist, composer, and arranger, "In the Mood" (died 1977).
 Monk Hazel, American drummer (died 1968).
 24 – Claude Hopkins, American stride pianist and bandleader (died 1984).

 September
 16 – Joe Venuti, Italian-American violinist (died 1978).

 October
 10 – Lee Blair, American banjoist and guitarist (died 1966).
 11 – Teddy Weatherford, American pianist and an accomplished stride pianist (died 1945).
 15 – Chas Remue, Belgian reedist (died 1971).
 16 – Big Joe Williams, American guitarist, singer, and songwriter (died 1982).

 December
 3 – Brad Gowans, American trombonist and reedist (died 1954).
 17 – Ray Noble, English bandleader, composer, arranger, radio comedian, and actor (died 1978).
 28 – Earl Hines, American pianist and bandleader (died 1983).
 29 – Clyde McCoy, American trumpeter (died 1990).

 Unknown date
 June Cole, American bassist, tubist, and singer (died 1960).

References

External links
 History Of Jazz Timeline: 1903 at All About Jazz

Jazz, 1903 In
Jazz by year